Morton on the Hill is a small but scattered village and civil parish in the English county of Norfolk, about  north-west of Norwich. For the purposes of local government, it falls within the district of Broadland.

The village's name means 'Moor farm/settlement'.

Its church, St Margaret, is one of 124 existing round-tower churches in Norfolk. The round tower is partly in ruins.

Notes 

http://kepn.nottingham.ac.uk/map/place/Norfolk/Morton%20on%20the%20Hill

External links

St Margaret's on the European Round Tower Churches website

Broadland
Villages in Norfolk
Civil parishes in Norfolk